Thamnoporella is an extinct genus of tabulate corals.

References

Tabulata
Prehistoric Hexacorallia genera